HF-73 also known as Hindustan Fighter-73 was a proposed twin engine strike fighter intended to be operated by the Indian Air Force. It was a joint venture project undertaken by India's Hindustan Aeronautics Limited and Messerschmitt-Bölkow-Blohm (MBB) of West Germany in 1972. The proposed HF-73 strike fighter was similar in design and role to the multi-national European consortium Panavia Aircraft GmbH's Panavia Tornado. The project was cancelled in the late 1970s.

Development

Super Marut 
After the induction of HF-24 Marut, the Indian Air Force (IAF) issued an Air Staff Requirements (ASR) for a ground attack fighter (GAF) in 1966, which called for an attack aircraft with a payload carrying capacity of 3500 kg and combat range of 720 km. Hindustan Aeronautics Limited (HAL) began development of the GAF and by 1967 submitted two design iterations of the proposed ground attack fighter viz, GAF-I and GAF-II. The proposed GAF-I was a dedicated fighter bomber powered by SNECMA M45 engines while GAF-II design proposal submitted in 1967 was an interceptor – ground attack fighter conceptually similar to the McDonnell Douglas F-4 Phantom II. Both design proposals were made after carrying out extensive wind tunnel testing; however, neither the GAF-I or the GAF-II received an approval from the IAF. In the meantime HAL also worked on a new variant of HF-24 Marut fighter bomber referred to as Super Marut or Marut Mk-2, in parallel to the development of GAF. The Marut Mk 2 had a redesigned aft fuselage to incorporate afterburning turbofan engines. The Marut Mk.2 variant was to be powered by two Rolls-Royce Turbomeca Adour afterburning turbofan engines. The first prototype of the Marut Mk.2, designated as the Marut Mk 1R, took its maiden flight on 10 January 1970 with underpowered Bristol Siddeley Orpheus turbojet engines, ending in a fatal crash right after take off. The crash was attributed to the failure of the new canopy locking system at a critical stage of take off, which resulted in the rapid loss of airspeed and eventual crash and death of the test pilot. This incident significantly impacted the progress of the project. Flight tests were resumed only in 1973.

HF-X programme 
In 1971, the IAF issued a revised ASR for an advanced deep penetration strike aircraft to replace its ageing fleet of English Electric Canberra and Hawker Hunter fighter bombers. As previous design proposals were turned down by the IAF, in 1972 HAL formed a joint venture with the MBB of Germany. The joint venture, called the Hindustan Fighter – Experimental (HF-X) programme, was tasked with designing and developing a new strike fighter for the IAF to fulfil its Deep Penetration Strike Aircraft (DPSA) requirement. The design of the new strike fighter to be built under the HF-X programme was finalized in 1973 and the aircraft was designated as Hindustan Fighter-73 or HF-73.

The proposed joint venture HF-73 design had some similarities with the Panavia Tornado, in which the MBB was a developmental partner. The HF-73 had air-intakes similar to that of Tornado but the former was designed as a fixed wing aircraft. The HF-73 prototypes were planned to be powered by SNECMA M45 afterburning turbofan engines while the production aircraft were to be powered by more powerful RB199 afterburning turbofan engines. The procurement of RB199 engine did not proceed for various reasons, and as a result the decision was made for the production aircraft to powered by the SNECMA engine, which had less thrust than what the design called for. HAL's inability to procure a suitable alternative to the planned RB199 engine, coupled with the IAF's reluctance to accept another underpowered fighter, eventually led to the termination of HF-X strike fighter programme along with the Super Marut programme sometime in the late-1970s.

Later, the DPSA requirement of the IAF was fulfilled with the Anglo-French SEPECAT Jaguar attack aircraft purchased in 1979. The Jaguar, capable of carrying out nuclear strike, was an attractive option for India which tested its first nuclear device under the codename "Operation Smiling Buddha" in 1974.

Specifications

See also 

 HAL HF-24 Marut

References 

HAL aircraft
Cancelled military aircraft projects
1970s Indian fighter aircraft